George W. Cannon was an American inventor from New York. He is best known for the invention of the mechanical dumbwaiter. Cannon first filed for the patent of a brake system (US Patent no. 260776) that could be used for a dumbwaiter on January 6, 1883. He later filed for the patent on the mechanical dumbwaiter (US Patent No. 361268) on February 17, 1887. He is reported to have generated a vast amount of money from royalties from his dumbwaiter patents until his death in 1897.

References

19th-century American inventors
1897 deaths
Year of birth missing